Michael Bryant (born 5 April 1959) is an English cricketer who played first-class cricket for Somerset in 1982. He was born at Camborne, Cornwall.

References

1959 births
Living people
English cricketers
Somerset cricketers
Cornwall cricketers